Some Other Stuff is the second album by American trombonist Grachan Moncur III recorded in 1964 and released on the Blue Note label in 1965. It features tenor saxophonist Wayne Shorter, pianist Herbie Hancock, bassist Cecil McBee and drummer Tony Williams. It was remastered by Rudy Van Gelder for CD in 2008.

Reception

The Allmusic review by Scott Yanow stated: "Grachan Moncur III was one of the top trombonists of the jazz avant-garde in the 1960s although he had only a few chances to lead his own record sessions. This 1964 set (which has been reissued on CD) was one of his finest... None of the compositions caught on but the strong and very individual improvising of the young musicians is enough of a reason to acquire the advanced music".

Compositions
According to Moncur, "Gnostic" is a free jazz piece "which eliminates a pulsating meter", should represent the achievement of salvation through the expression of knowledge and wisdom. "Thandiwa" means "beloved one" in the Zulu language, and it is the least experimental track of the album. With "The Twins", built off only one chord, he wanted to portray his twin brothers; he considered the rhythm the focal point of the composition. "Nomadic" is centered on a drum solo by Tony Williams.

Track listing
All compositions by Grachan Moncur III
 "Gnostic" - 11:46
 "Thandiwa" - 8:21
 "The Twins" - 12:55
 "Nomadic" - 7:43

Personnel
Grachan Moncur III - trombone
Wayne Shorter - tenor saxophone
Herbie Hancock - piano
Cecil McBee - bass
Tony Williams - drums

References

Blue Note Records albums
Grachan Moncur III albums
1965 albums
Albums recorded at Van Gelder Studio
Albums produced by Alfred Lion